Habibah Ruth Garba  is an Air Commodore in the Nigerian Air Force. She is the first woman to be promoted to the rank of an Air Commodore in Nigerian Air Force. She worn the Karis Award in 2013 and the Female Achievers’ Award of the Women in Management, Business and Public Service (WIMBIZ) 2018 conference in Nigeria.

Career
Habibah Ruth Garba  is an Air Commodore in the Nigerian Air Force, Nigeria. She is the first woman to be promoted to the rank of an Air Commodore in Nigerian Air Force. She emerged the winner of 2013 Karis Award. This is an annual award of the Household of God Church in Nigeria. The award is part of the annual GRACE programme of the church initiated in 1990. She also worn the Female Achievers’ Award in the Women in Management, Business and Public Service (WIMBIZ) 2018 conference. The conference is constituted to implement programs that inspire, empower and promote more representation of women in public and private sectors.

See also
Sadique Abubakar

References 

Living people
Nigerian security personnel
Women in law enforcement
20th-century Nigerian women
21st-century Nigerian women
Nigerian Air Force personnel
Nigerian female military personnel
Year of birth missing (living people)